Stephen Dixon (born Stephen Bruce Ditchik; June 6, 1936 – November 6, 2019) was an American author of novels and short stories.

Life and career 
Dixon was born on June 6, 1936 in Manhattan, New York. He was the fifth of seven children of Florence Leder, a beauty queen, chorus girl on Broadway, and interior decorator, and Abraham M. Ditchik. He graduated from the City College of New York in 1958 and was a faculty member of Johns Hopkins University. Before becoming a full-time writer, Dixon worked a plethora of odd jobs ranging from bus driver to bartender. In his early 20s he worked as a journalist and in radio, interviewing such political figures as John F. Kennedy, Richard Nixon and Nikita Khrushchev.

Dixon was nominated for the National Book Award twice, in 1991 for Frog and in 1995 for Interstate. He also was awarded a Guggenheim Fellowship, the American Academy of Arts and Letters Prize for Fiction, the O. Henry Award, and the Pushcart Prize. He cited Anton Chekhov, Samuel Beckett, Franz Kafka, Thomas Bernhard, and James Joyce as some of his favorite authors.

Dixon died from complications of Parkinson's disease at a hospice center in Towson, Maryland on November 6, 2019; he was 83.

Works

Novels
Work (Street Fiction Press, 1977)
Too Late (Harper & Row, 1978)
Fall & Rise (North Point Press, 1985)
Garbage (Cane Hill Press, 1988)
Frog (British American Publishing, 1991)
Interstate (Henry Holt, 1995)
Gould (Henry Holt, 1997)
30: Pieces of a Novel (Henry Holt, 1999)
Tisch (Red Hen Press, 2000) (his first completed novel, written 1961-1969)
I. (McSweeney's, 2002)
Old Friends (Melville House Publishing, 2004)
Phone Rings (Melville House Publishing, 2005)
End of I. (McSweeney's, 2006)
Meyer (Melville House Publishing, 2007)
Story of a Story and Other Stories: A Novel (Fugue State Press), 2012
His Wife Leaves Him (Fantagraphics Books), 2013
Letters to Kevin (Fantagraphics Books), 2016
Beatrice (Publishing Genius), 2016

Story collections
No Relief (Street Fiction Press, 1976)
Quite Contrary: The Mary and Newt Story (Harper & Row, 1979)
14 Stories (Johns Hopkins, 1980)
Movies: Seventeen Stories (North Point Press, 1983)
Time to Go (Will and Magna Stories) (Johns Hopkins, 1984)
The Play and Other Stories (Coffee House Press, 1988)
Love and Will: Twenty Stories (Paris Review Editions / British American Publishing, 1989)
All Gone: 18 Short Stories (Johns Hopkins, 1990)
Friends: More Will and Magna Stories (Asylum Arts, 1990)
Long Made Short (Johns Hopkins, 1994)
The Stories of Stephen Dixon (Henry Holt, 1994)
Man on Stage: Play Stories (Hi Jinx Press, 1996)
Sleep (Coffee House Press, 1999)
The Switch (Rain Taxi, 1999) (a single story; Rain Taxi Brainstorm Series, Number 3)
What Is All This?: The Uncollected Stories of Stephen Dixon (Fantagraphics Books, 2010)
Late Stories (Trnsfr Books, 2016)
Dear Abigail and Other Stories (Trnsfr Books, 2019)
Writing, Written (Fantagraphics Books, 2019)

References

External links
10/14/19 Review of his most recent (2019) books
Comprehensive career interview with Fifth Wednesday Journal.
2002 profile of Dixon in The Johns Hopkins News-Letter
"The Plug", Dixon on Thomas Bernhard, at Rain Taxi
1997 article about Dixon in The Johns Hopkins News-Letter
Excerpt from the novel I., at McSweeney's Internet Tendency, with links to other excerpts, and to comments on Dixon's work by Jonathan Lethem and J. Robert Lennon.
February 2007 article about Dixon in Baltimore City Paper
Dixon interviewed by Tao Lin

1936 births
2019 deaths
20th-century American male writers
20th-century American novelists
20th-century American short story writers
21st-century American male writers
21st-century American novelists
21st-century American short story writers
American male novelists
American male short story writers
Deaths from Parkinson's disease
Neurological disease deaths in Maryland
MacDowell Colony fellows
Johns Hopkins University faculty
Novelists from Maryland
Novelists from New York (state)
PEN/Faulkner Award for Fiction winners
Writers from New York City
Writers from Baltimore